Antonio Castanon (or Toño Castañon) is a Mexican businessman.

Alleged money laundering

In November, 1995, Antonio Castañon and Paulina Castañon, Raúl Salinas's wife, were arrested in Geneva, Switzerland after attempting to withdraw US$84 million from an account owned by Raúl Salinas de Gortari, brother of Mexican President Carlos Salinas de Gortari.  Their capture led to the unveiling of a vast family fortune spread around the world amounting to hundreds of millions of dollars.   A report by the U.S. General Accounting Office indicated that over $90 million were transferred out of Mexico and into private bank accounts in Switzerland and London, through a complex set of transactions between 1992 and 1994, using a private investment company named Trocca, all with the help of Citibank and its affiliates. In 2008, the government of Switzerland turned over $74 million, out of the $110 million in frozen bank accounts held by Trocca to the government of Mexico.  The Swiss Justice Ministry indicated that the Mexican government had demonstrated that $66 million of the funds had been misappropriated, and the funds, with interest, were returned to Mexico.  The bank accounts were held at Pictet & Cie, Citibank Zurich, Julius Baer Bank, and Banque privée Edmond de Rothschild in Geneva and Zurich.  Other funds were returned to third parties, including Mexican billionaire Carlos Peralta Quintero, who had given the funds to set up the investment company. Antonio and Paulina Castañon were released a couple weeks after the arrest.

References

Bibliography
Oppenheimer, Andres. Bordering on Chaos. New York: Little, Brown, 1996.

External links
BBC news release
BBC story about Salinas de Gortari's acquittal

Mexican businesspeople
Mexican fraudsters
Year of birth missing (living people)
Living people
Political scandals in Mexico